Wolfurt railway station is a railway station in the municipality of Wolfurt, in the district of Bregenz, in the Austrian state of Vorarlberg. It is located on the Vorarlberg line of Austrian Federal Railways (ÖBB). Adjacent to the station is the Wolfurt Freight Centre, also known as ÖBB Terminal Wolfurt, a major goods station.

Services 
 the following services stop at Wolfurt:

References

External links 
 
 

Railway stations in Vorarlberg
Vorarlberg S-Bahn stations